The Fanfani I Cabinet was the 9th cabinet of the Italian Republic, which held office from 18 January 1954 to 10 February 1954, for a total of  days.

The Government fell on 30 January, after the Chamber rejected the trust with 260 votes in favor, 303 votes against and 12 abstentions out of 563 present. This was the shortest-lived cabinet in the history of the Italian Republic.

Government parties
The Fanfani I Cabinet was a one-party government, composed only of members of Christian Democracy (DC).

Composition

References

Italian governments
1954 establishments in Italy
1954 disestablishments in Italy
Cabinets established in 1954
Cabinets disestablished in 1954